Drusilla is a female given name deriving from the Roman cognomen Drusilla.

History 
The name has its origin from the Latin cognomen (and later praenomen) Drusus which itself derived from the Greek drosos (dew). The diminutive "illa" transforms the name into feminine form. The most notable ancient Roman women bearing the name were members of the Julio-Claudian dynasty, empress Livia Drusilla (wife of emperor Augustus), princesses Julia Drusilla the Elder (sister of emperor Caligula) and Julia Drusilla the Younger (daughter of Caligula). Women such as the Herodian princess Drusilla and Mauretanian princess Drusilla were named in their honor, thus spreading the name across the Roman Empire. As a name appearing in the Bible it was adopted by English speakers in the 17th century. The name has never been very popular in the United States where, according to Social Security Administration records, from 1880 to 1914 its highest ranking of girls' names was 612 out of 1,000 in 1886.

People 
 Drusilla Modjeska (born 1946), Australian writer and editor
 Drusilla Wills (1884–1951), British stage and film actress
 Drusilla Wilson (1815–1908), American temperance leader and Quaker pastor

Fictional characters 
 Drusilla, aka Wonder Girl, Wonder Woman's sister in the TV series Wonder Woman
 Drusilla (Buffy the Vampire Slayer), in the TV series and its spin-off Angel
 Drusilla Paddock, in The Worst Witch children's novel series
 Drusilla Blackthorn, from Cassandra Clare's trilogy The Dark Artifices
 Drusilla, a succubus in the webcomic Pibgorn
 Drusilla Clack, a hypocritical Evangelist in Wilkie Collins's novel The Moonstone
 Drusilla Sartoris, in William Faulkner's novel The Unvanquished
 Drusilla Arbuckle, character from The Garfield Show
Drusilla Lamb, Played by Gillian Lewis in the 1960s Tv series 'Mr Rose'.

See also 
 Drizella Tremaine, a character in Disney's 1950 film Cinderella

Notes

Latin feminine given names